The 2013 European Karate Championships, the 48th edition, were held in Budapest, Hungary from 9 to 12 May 2013. A total of 497 competitors from 45 countries participated at the event.

Participating countries

Medalists

Men's competition

Individual

Team

Women's competition

Individual

Team

Medal table

References

2013
International sports competitions hosted by Hungary
European Karate Championships
European championships in 2013
International sports competitions in Budapest
2010s in Budapest
Karate competitions in Hungary
May 2013 sports events in Europe